The 2005 South American Rugby Championship was the 27th edition of the competition of the leading national Rugby Union teams in South America.

The tournament was played in Buenos Aires, Argentina. Argentina won the tournament with the selection of Argentinian Provinces ("Provincias Argentinas"), practically the third level selection.

Standings 
 Three point for victory, two for draw, and one for lost 
{| class="wikitable"
|-
!width=165|Team
!width=40|Played
!width=40|Won
!width=40|Drawn
!width=40|Lost
!width=40|For
!width=40|Against
!width=40|Difference
!width=40|Pts
|- bgcolor=#ccffcc align=center
|align=left| 
|2||2||0||0||75||34||+ 41||6
|- align=center
|align=left| 
|2||1||0||1||55||52||+ 3||4
|- align=center
|align=left| 
|2||0||0||2||38||82||-44||2
|}

Results  
First Round

Second Round

Third Round

References

2005
2005 rugby union tournaments for national teams
A
2005 in Argentine rugby union
rugby union
rugby union
International rugby union competitions hosted by Argentina